Alec Jacoby "Coby" White (born February 16, 2000) is an American professional basketball player for the Chicago Bulls of the National Basketball Association (NBA). He played college basketball for the North Carolina Tar Heels. White was a top high school player in North Carolina, finishing his career as the top prep scorer in state history. After being selected by the Bulls in the first round of the 2019 NBA draft with the seventh overall pick, he was named to the NBA All-Rookie Second Team in 2020.

High school career
White, a 6'4" combo guard, played high school basketball at the Greenfield School in Wilson, North Carolina. He scored 3,573 points over his four-year career, becoming the all-time leading scorer in North Carolina high school basketball history, a record previously held by JamesOn Curry. At the close of his senior season, White was named North Carolina Mr. Basketball as the state's top high school player. White was also awarded the 2018 USA Today's North Carolina Player of the Year. He was named to the 2018 McDonald's All-American Game alongside fellow UNC signee Nassir Little. White also was nominated to the MaxPreps All-America first team.  

During the summer after graduating, White was named to the United States U18 National team to compete in the 2018 FIBA Under-18 Americas Championship in Canada. White helped lead the team to a gold medal as the team's top scorer, earning all-tournament honors.

College career

White signed a National Letter of Intent to play for North Carolina on November 8, 2017. White made his debut in a game against Wofford on November 6, 2018, starting at point guard, and recording eight points and three assists in North Carolina's 78–67 win over Wofford. On February 26, 2019, when his team was playing against Syracuse, White scored a career-high 34 points while leading the Tar Heels to a 93–85 victory. On March 5, White passed Michael Jordan in North Carolina's all-time freshman scoring list with 469 in North Carolina's 79–66 win over Boston College. White helped lead the team in the 2019 NCAA tournament, where they were eventually defeated by Auburn 97–80 in the Sweet 16 round of the tournament. White also broke a North Carolina basketball freshman record of three point shooting, hitting 82 during his college season. On April 3, 2019, White declared for the 2019 NBA draft after one season at North Carolina, where he earned All-ACC 2nd Team honors.

Professional career

Chicago Bulls (2019–present)
On June 20, 2019, the Chicago Bulls drafted Coby White with the seventh overall pick in the 2019 NBA draft. White is the first player from North Carolina to be drafted in the first round by the Bulls since Michael Jordan in 1984. On July 1, 2019, White signed with the Bulls. White participated in the 2019 NBA Summer League with fellow 2019 draftee Daniel Gafford, where he averaged 15.0 points, 5.6 rebounds, and 4.8 assists per game. On October 23, 2019, White made his debut in the NBA, coming off the bench in a 126–125 loss to the Charlotte Hornets with 17 points, three rebounds and seven assists. This game made him the first player born in the 2000s to play in the NBA.

On November 12, 2019, White hit seven 3-pointers in the fourth quarter against the New York Knicks, setting a Bulls franchise record for most 3-pointers made in a single quarter, and finished with 27 points in the 120–102 victory. On February 22, 2020, White scored a then career-high 33 points in a 112–104 loss to the Phoenix Suns. White would match that career high the next day, leading the Bulls to a 126–117 win over the Washington Wizards. White became the first rookie in NBA history with consecutive 30-point games off the bench. On February 25, White continued the streak and exceeded his career-high, scoring 35 points in a 124–122 loss to the Oklahoma City Thunder. On September 15, 2020, White was named 2019–20 NBA All-Rookie Second Team by the NBA.

On February 10, 2021, White finished with 30 points, eight 3-pointers, and 7 assists in a 129–116 win over the New Orleans Pelicans, setting a Bulls franchise record with teammate Zach LaVine when they each made 8 shots from behind the arc. 

On June 10, 2021, White underwent left shoulder surgery and was ruled out for at least four months. On September 22, the Bulls exercised their fourth-year option on White, keeping him under team control through the 2022–23 season.

On January 31, 2023, in a game versus to Los Angeles Clippers, 
White became the became the fastest player (237 games) in Bulls franchise history to make 500 career three point baskets.

Career statistics

NBA

Regular season

|-
| style="text-align:left;"|
| style="text-align:left;"|Chicago
| 65 || 1 || 25.8 || .394 || .354 || .791 || 3.5 || 2.7 || .8 || .1 || 13.2
|-
| style="text-align:left;"|
| style="text-align:left;"|Chicago
| 69 || 54 || 31.2 || .416 || .359 || .901 || 4.1 || 4.8 || .6 || .2 || 15.1
|-
| style="text-align:left;"|
| style="text-align:left;"|Chicago
| 61 || 17 || 27.5 || .433 || .385 || .857 || 3.0 || 2.9 || .5 || .2 || 12.7
|- class="sortbottom"
| style="text-align:center;" colspan="2"|Career
| 195 || 72 || 28.2 || .413 || .365 || .851 || 3.6 || 3.5 || .6 || .2 || 13.7

Playoffs

|-
| style="text-align:left;"|2022
| style="text-align:left;"|Chicago
| 5 || 0 || 19.6 || .333 || .276 || .800 || 3.4 || 1.8 || .2 || .0 || 8.4
|- class="sortbottom"
| style="text-align:center;" colspan="2"|Career
| 5 || 0 || 19.6 || .333 || .276 || .800 || 3.4 || 1.8 || .2 || .0 || 8.4

College

|-
| style="text-align:left;"| 2018–19
| style="text-align:left;"| North Carolina
| 35 || 35 || 28.5 || .423 || .353 || .800 || 3.5 || 4.1 || 1.1 || .3 || 16.1

Personal life
White's father, Donald, previously played college basketball at North Carolina Central before becoming a factory worker until his death on August 15, 2017, to liver cancer. His mother is a claims manager for an insurance company. He also has a sister an older brother, Will, who played basketball and is currently an assistant coach for Mars Hill University.  He has a personal connection with NBA player Chris Paul, as he played for Paul's Amateur Athletic Union (AAU) program, Team CP3.

References

External links
North Carolina Tar Heels bio
USA Basketball bio

2000 births
Living people
American men's basketball players
Basketball players from North Carolina
Chicago Bulls draft picks
Chicago Bulls players
McDonald's High School All-Americans
North Carolina Tar Heels men's basketball players
People from Goldsboro, North Carolina
Point guards
Shooting guards